Located in the city of Maceió, the Federal University of Alagoas (UFAL or Ufal) is the major university in coastal state Alagoas and one of the main research centers in Brazilian north eastern region (one of the five regions of Brazil). It is located very near the city's airport.

Academic units 

 EEF - School of Nursing and Pharmacy;
 ICF - Institute of Pharmaceutical Sciences
 CONTACT - Faculty of Arts;
 ICS - Institute of Social Sciences;
 IC - Institute of Computing;
 IF - Institute of Physics;
 ICAT - Institute of Atmospheric Sciences;
 IM - Institute of Mathematics;
 IQB - Institute of Chemistry and Biotechnology;
 CTEC - Center for Technology;
 FALE - Faculty of Letters;
 FAU - College of Architecture and Urbanism;
 FOUFAL - School of Dentistry;
 FEAC - Faculty of Economics, Management and Accounting;
 FN - School of Nutrition;
 FSSO - School of Social Service;
 FAMED - School of Medicine;
 ECSC - Center for Agricultural Sciences;
 CEDU - Education Center;
 FDA - Faculty of Law of Alagoas;
 ICBS - Institute of Biological Sciences and Health;
 IGDEMA - Institute of Geography, Development and Environment;
 ICHCA - Institute of Social Sciences, Communication and Arts.
 IP - Institute of Psychology

See also
Brazil University Rankings
Universities and Higher Education in Brazil

References

External links

Brazilian Ministry of Education and Culture

Education in Alagoas
Alagoas
Buildings and structures in Alagoas
1961 establishments in Brazil
Educational institutions established in 1961